Min-seok, also spelled Min-suk, is a Korean masculine given name. Its meaning differs based on the hanja used to write each syllable of the name. There are 27 hanja with the reading "min" and 20 hanja with the reading "seok" on the South Korean government's official list of hanja which may be registered for use in given names.

People with this name include:
Sportspeople
Kim Min-suk (swimmer) (born 1979), South Korean swimmer
Kim Min-seok (table tennis) (born 1992), South Korean table tennis player
Kim Min-seok (figure skater) (born 1993), South Korean figure skater 
Kim Min-seok (speed skater) (born 1999), South Korean speed skater

Entertainers
Oh Min-suk (born 1980), South Korean actor
Kim Min-seok (actor) (born 1990), South Korean actor
Xiumin (born Kim Min-seok, 1990), South Korean singer, member of Exo
 South Korean lyricist who wrote the song "Fucking USA"

Other
Cho Minsuk (born 1966), South Korean architect
Baek Minseok (born 1971), South Korean writer
Jeong Min-suk (born 1978), alias Jeong Yol, South Korean LGBT rights activist

See also
List of Korean given names

References

Korean masculine given names